Megasis ragonoti is a species of snout moth in the genus Megasis. It was described by Patrice J.A. Leraut in 2003 and is known from Altai, Russia.

References

Moths described in 2003
Endemic fauna of Altai
Phycitini